Salutaridine, also known as floripavine, is an alkaloid that is present in the morphinian alkaloid pathway of opium poppy. Its biosynthetic precursor is the alkaloid (R)-reticuline. (R)-Reticuline is converted to salutaridine by the enzyme salutaridine synthase. Salutaridine is converted to salutaridinol by the enzyme salutaridine reductase (SalR), with the reduction of NADPH to NADP+.

References 

Morphinans
Phenols
Enones
Phenol ethers